Bayazit Khamatdinovich Gizatullin (1 July 1936 – 13 November 2011) was a Russian cross-country skier. He competed in the men's 30 kilometre event at the 1964 Winter Olympics.

References

External links
 

1936 births
2011 deaths
Russian male cross-country skiers
Olympic cross-country skiers of the Soviet Union
Cross-country skiers at the 1964 Winter Olympics
People from Bashkortostan
Sportspeople from Bashkortostan